Psalm 3 is the third psalm of the Book of Psalms, beginning in English in the King James Version: "Lord, how are they increased that trouble me! many are they that rise up against me". In Latin, it is known as "Domine quid multiplicati sunt". The psalm is a personal thanksgiving to God, who answered the prayer of an afflicted soul. It is attributed to David and relates in particular to the time when he fled from his son Absalom.

The psalm is a regular part of Jewish, Catholic, Lutheran, Anglican and other Protestant liturgies. It has often been set to music, including works in Latin by Marc-Antoine Charpentier, Michel-Richard Delalande and Henry Purcell.

Text

Hebrew Bible version 
Following is the Hebrew text of Psalm 3:

King James Version 
 Lord, how are they increased that trouble me! many are they that rise up against me.
 Many there be which say of my soul, There is no help for him in God. Selah.
 But thou, O LORD, art a shield for me; my glory, and the lifter up of mine head.
 I cried unto the LORD with my voice, and he heard me out of his holy hill. Selah.
 I laid me down and slept; I awaked; for the LORD sustained me.
 I will not be afraid of ten thousands of people, that have set themselves against me round about.
 Arise, O LORD; save me, O my God: for thou hast smitten all mine enemies upon the cheek bone; thou hast broken the teeth of the ungodly.
 Salvation belongeth unto the LORD: thy blessing is upon thy people. Selah.

Context 
Psalm 3 is the first Psalm with a title in the original and it concerns a specific time of crisis in David's life. David fled Absalom because of a series of events that followed from David being under discipline for his own sins regarding Bathsheba and Uriah the Hittite (2 Samuel, chapter 11). In that light, the prayer is a model for looking to God for help even in the midst of God's chastisement. Even so, David prays, "Thy blessings by upon your people".

An evening and a morning are seen (verse 5) as David lays down to sleep and wakes up protected and sustained by providence. Absalom's advisor Ahitophel is personified as the mouth who David asks God to "break the teeth of", and in the account, Ahitophel's counsel is frustrated and Ahitophel faces his demise. David fleeing his son at the start of Psalm 3 is in direct contrast with taking refuge in "the Son" at the end of Psalm 2.

This is also the first Psalm which has the word or instruction selah, which appears after verses 2, 4 and 8. The final selah possibly indicates that Psalm 3 and Psalm 4 are tied together somehow.

David spent more years fleeing Saul as a young man than he spent fleeing his son Absalom. David wrote many psalms that we find later in the book of psalms regarding situations where he was being pursued by Saul. But here is one of the opening songs in the Book of Psalms, and it is about the painful experience of fleeing from his own son.

Commentary

Matthew Henry 
According to Matthew Henry's Concise Commentary written in 1706, verses 1-3 represent David complaining to God of his enemies, and confiding in God. Verses 4-8 represent his triumphs over his fears, and "give God the glory", while "taking to himself the comfort".

Martin Luther 
Martin Luther felt that, overall, the goal in this Psalm is to impart the confidence of those who consider themselves followers of  YHWH to call on him. "But you, Yahweh, are a shield around me, my glory, and uplifts my head." (verse 3; Hebrew: v 4): This is the emphatic prayer of the oppressed who turn aside to YHWH.

Although written in the mouth of David (Hebrew title; Hebrew: verse 1) the reader is encouraged to consider how God rescues someone like David, who was at that time very in distress, saved and later raised to be king over all Israel.

Uses

Judaism 
 In the Old Testament, the prayer of Jonah in the "fish" starts with Psalm 3 and he also ends his prayer drawing on Psalm 3. Jonah also draws on other psalms, namely Psalms 16, 18, 31, 42, 50, 88, 116, 118, 119 and 120.
 Verses 2-9 are part of the prayers of the Bedtime Shema and occasional sunrise Shema.
 Verse 9 is the eighth verse of V'hu Rachum in Pesukei Dezimra and is also found in Havdalah.

Eastern Orthodox Church 
 Psalm 3 is the first Psalm, of "The Six Psalms" which are read as part of every Orthros (Matins) service. During the reading of the Six Psalms, movement and noise are strongly discouraged, as it is regarded as one of the most holy moments of the Orthros service.

Catholic Church 
About 530 in the Rule of St. Benedict, Benedict of Nursia chose Psalm 3 for the beginning of the office of matins, namely as the first psalm in the liturgy of the Benedictine during the year. In the abbeys that preserve the tradition, it is currently the first Psalm Sunday for the office of vigils.

In the current Liturgy of the Hours, Psalm 3 is sung or recited the first Office of Readings on Sunday of the week, after the first two psalms.

Book of Common Prayer 
In the Church of England's Book of Common Prayer, Psalm 3 is appointed to be read on the morning of the first day of the month.

Musical settings
Psalm 3 has been set to music by many composers. Heinrich Schütz wrote a setting of a paraphrase in German, "Ach wie groß ist der Feinde Rott", SWV 099, for the Becker Psalter, published first in 1628.Marc-Antoine Charpentier composed around 1676 one "Domine quid multiplicati sunt", for 3 voices, 2 treble instruments and continuo, H.172. Michel-Richard Delalande composed his grand motet Domine quid sunt Multiplicati (S.37) for the offices of the Chapel of Versailles, and Henry Purcell set a variant version of the Latin text, "Jehova, quam multi sunt hostes mei," for five voices and continuo. There are also Byron Cage's "Thou Art A Shield For Me", and "Christian Karaoke Praise Song Psalm 3 worship" by Andrew Bain.

References

External links 

 
 
  in Hebrew and English - Mechon-mamre
 Text of Psalm 3 according to the 1928 Psalter
 For the leader;* with stringed instruments. A psalm of David / Answer me when I call, my saving God (text and footnotes) United States Conference of Catholic Bishops
 Psalm 3:1 (introduction and text) biblestudytools.com
 Psalm 3 – Peace in the Midst of the Storm enduringword.com
 Psalm 3 / Refrain: You, Lord, are a shield about me. Church of England
 Psalm 3 at biblegateway.com
 Hymns for Psalm 3 hymnary.org

003
Works attributed to David